William Arthur Sheffield (born 26 August 2000) is an English cricketer. He made his first-class debut on 22 August 2020, for Sussex in the 2020 Bob Willis Trophy.

References

External links
 

2000 births
Living people
English cricketers
Sussex cricketers
Place of birth missing (living people)